Elisabeth of Hesse (4 March 1503 – 4 January 1563, Lauingen) was a Landgravine of Hesse by birth and by marriage Countess Palatine of Zweibrücken and later Countess Palatine of Simmern.

Life 
Elizabeth was the youngest of five daughters of Landgrave William I of Hesse (1466–1515) from his marriage to Anna of Brunswick-Wolfenbüttel (1460–1520), daughter of Duke William of Brunswick-Wolfenbüttel.  Elizabeth was raised as a Protestant.  In 1518, she was kidnapped by just Landgrave Philip I of Hesse, who had just come of age, to prevent a marriage which her mother Anna had planned, but which Elisabeth herself was opposed to.

She married on 10 September 1525 in Kassel, Count Palatine and Duke Louis II of Zweibrücken (1502–1532).  This marriage of a princess inclined to the Reformation with a close relative of Philip the Magnanimous, the largest promoter of the Reformation, gave a considerable boost to the Reformation in the Duchy of Zweibrücken.  The marriage had been planned for the spring of 1525, but the German Peasants' War interfered.  Elizabeth was regarded as extremely pious, affable and benevolent.  She used her considerable inheritance to compensate the victims of the peasant uprising in the Duchy.  After her husband's early death, Emperor Ferdinand I appointed Elisabeth and Count Palatine Rupert of Veldenz as joint regents for her young son.

On 9 January 1541, Elisabeth married her second husband, Count Palatine George of Simmern (1518–1569).  She made a significant contribution when she and George finally managed to enforce the reformation in Simmern.

Issue 
From her first marriage to Louis II of Zweibrücken, she had two children:
 Wolfgang (1526–1569), Count Palatine of Palatinate-Zweibrücken, married in 1545 Anna of Hesse (1529–1591)
 Christine (1528–1534)

From her second marriage to George of Simmern-Sponheim, she had a son:
 John (1541–1562)

References 
 J. P. Gelbert: Magister Johann Bader's Leben und Schriften, Nicolaus Thomae und seine Briefe: Ein Beitrag zur Reformationsgeschichte der Städte Landau, Bergzabern und der linksrheinischen Pfalz, Gottschick-Witter, 1868, p. 140 ff
 Johann Georg Lehmann: Vollständige Geschichte des Herzogtums Zweibrücken und seiner Fürsten, Kaiser, 1867, p. 293
 Ludwig Armbrust: Die Entführung der Landgräfin Elisabeth durch ihren Vetter Philipp (1518). Ein Beitrag zu Philipps Charakteristik, in: Zeitschrift des Vereins für hessische Geschichte und Landeskunde, vol. 38, 1904, pp. 14–30

External links 
 [http://www.guide2womenleaders.com/womeninpower/Womeninpower1500.htm Women in Power 1500-1540], viewed on 12 July 2010, part of: Martin K.I. Christensen: Worldwide Guide to Women in Leadership''

Footnotes 

German duchesses
Countesses Palatine of Zweibrücken
House of Hesse
House of Wittelsbach
1503 births
1563 deaths
16th-century German people
Daughters of monarchs